Las Marías also known as Puntas las Marías is one of the forty subbarrios of Santurce, San Juan, Puerto Rico.

Demographics
In 2000, Las Marías had a population of 1,172.

In 2010, Las Marías had a population of 895 and a population density of 9,944.4 persons per square mile.

Description
It is part of the Ocean Park beach community and connects Santurce with the city of Carolina through the Isla Verde touristic boulevard.

See also
 
 List of communities in Puerto Rico

References

Santurce, San Juan, Puerto Rico
Municipality of San Juan